KLH may refer to:

Keyhole limpet hemocyanin, a carrier protein
Kolhapur Airport (IATA code KLH), a regional airport in Kolhapur, Maharashtra, India
Korean Light Helicopter, a designation used by the Republic of Korea Army
KLH (company), an audio company founded in 1957 in Cambridge, Massachusetts, United States
KLH-Arena, a set of ski jump hills in Murau, Austria
KLH Vajgar Jindřichův Hradec, an ice hockey team in Jindřichův Hradec, Czech Republic
WKLH (also known simply as KLH), a radio station in Milwaukee, Wisconsin, United States

See also
KHL